Anne Rey (1944 – 31 January 2012) was a French musicologist, pianist, journalist and educator.

Life 
Born in 1944, Rey is the daughter of an architect and a psychoanalyst. She was trained as a pianist and musicologist.

In 1968, she became a freelancer for the newspaper Le Monde. In 1978, she was part of the founding team of the monthly magazine Le Monde de la musique. There, she worked in collaboration with Louis Dandrel, Francis Mayor, Bernard Lauzanne...

She wrote numerous articles on music and a biography of Erik Satie for Éditions du Seuil.

For le Monde de la musique, she proposed to open the editions of the monthly magazine specialized in classic music to jazz, rock, song, dance, musical theatre.

In the 1980s, she worked in the culture department of the newspaper Le Monde, and created the supplement Arts et spectacles, open to rock, contemporary dance, world musics. She left the newspaper in 1995 to teach cultural mediation at the university.
  
In 2006, she published Mozart et ses masques in the Omnibus series.

Rey died in Paris 31 January 2012 and is buried in the Île d'Yeu.

Bibliography 
 Anne Rey, Erik Satie, Éditions du Seuil - Series Solfèges, No 35, 1974 (1st edition), 1995 (2nd edition).
 Anne Rey, Historical and literary file and selection of texts by various authors for Une vie by Maupassant, Editions Presses Pocket, 1990 (1st edition), 1998 (2e édition). 

References 

1944 births
2012 deaths
20th-century French musicologists
21st-century French musicologists
20th-century French journalists
21st-century French journalists
French women journalists
20th-century French essayists
21st-century French essayists
French women essayists
French music critics
French women critics
Classical music critics
20th-century French women writers
21st-century French women writers